Giuseppe Cali may refer to:

Giuseppe Calì, Maltese painter
Giuseppe Calì (golfer), Italian golfer